This is a list of fighter aces in World War II from Norway. For other countries see List of World War II aces by country

External links 
Article that presents Norwegian ace, Rolf Arne Berg

Norway
Royal Norwegian Air Force
World War II aces from Norway